The following is a list of "television plays" broadcast on Australian broadcaster GTV-9 during the 1950s and 1960s.
Emergency (1959) - TV series

References

See also
List of live television plays broadcast on Australian Broadcasting Corporation (1950s)
List of television plays broadcast on ATN-7

GTV-9 plays
 GTV-9 plays
GTV-9 plays, live
GTV-9, live